The Bride Goes Wild is a 1948 American romantic comedy film directed by Norman Taurog.

Van Johnson stars as irresponsible children's book author and part-time playboy Uncle Bumps, who is introduced to a no-nonsense children's book illustrator played by June Allyson.

Cast 
 Van Johnson as Greg Rawlings
 June Allyson as Martha Terryton
 Butch Jenkins as Danny
 Hume Cronyn as John McGrath
 Una Merkel as Miss Doberly
 Arlene Dahl as Tillie Smith
 Richard Derr as Bruce Kope Johnson
 Lloyd Corrigan as "Pop"
 Elisabeth Risdon as Mrs. Carruthers
 Clara Blandick as Aunt Pewtie
 Kathleen Howard as Aunt Susan
 Byron Foulger as Max (uncredited)
 Hank Mann as Wedding Guest (uncredited)
 William Severn as Piute Leader (uncredited)

Reception
The film earned $2,707,000 in the US and Canada and $1,059,000 elsewhere.

On June 4, 1948, The New York Times' Bosley Crowther wrote: “For a movie with as inauspicious a title as The Bride Goes Wild… this patchwork of sentiment and slapstick is a surprisingly genial little show. And if you'll take it as nonsense entertainment, it will give you a pretty good time. In the first place, that title means nothing—absolutely nothing at all. More appropriate to the evident activities would be The Picture Goes Wild. For the most salient aspect of the story is its positive progression from a point of comparative intelligence at the beginning to reckless disorder at the end.”

Josephine O'Neill praised the film in her July 18, 1949, review in the Daily Telegraph: “MGM's moonstruck pair, Van Johnson and June Allyson, become surprisingly engaging comedians in this frivolous comedy. They have the fillip of an original story… Norman Taurog, who knows his comedy and his kids, lays on the laughter freely. Sometimes his slapstick is enormously successful — as when the orphanage kids submit Van and his harassed publisher (Hume Cronyn) to an Indian raid. Sometimes, as in the ants-at-the-wedding, it is Mack Sennett. The result is generally fetching, with livelier dialogue than usual; and one of the prettiest tipsy scenes from Miss Allyson that you could imagine. To sum up: Enjoyment.

Legacy
The Bride Goes Wild was presented on the Stars in the Air radio program on February 28, 1952. Dick Powell and June Allyson starred in the 30-minute adaptation.

Turner Classic Movies presented The Bride Goes Wild on October 7, 2015 in commemoration of what would have been Allyson's 98th birthday.

References

External links 
 
 Turner Classic Movies page

1948 films
1948 romantic comedy films
American romantic comedy films
American black-and-white films
1940s English-language films
Films about writers
Films directed by Norman Taurog
Films set in New York (state)
Films set in Vermont
Metro-Goldwyn-Mayer films
1940s American films